I Am Not A Freemdoom is the second album by Masters of the Hemisphere, released in 2000 on Kindercore Records. It is a concept album containing a comic book, for which the songs provide the soundtrack.

Critical reception
Exclaim! called the album a "big bomb," writing that "the music is the lone positive point, and the Masters have a great knack for arranging sounds." The Pitch called it "both an incredibly obtuse and somehow curiously listenable disc, and that’s doubly true for fans of chamber pop, an admittedly acquired taste."

Track listing
So What About Freemdoom
Who Is This Dog?
The Dog Who Controls People's Lungs
The New Commotion
Gorgar's Room
Freemdoom's Lab
The New Freemdoom
The Sun in the Afternoon
Summer In Krone Ishta
Mal Needs To Talk About The Things He Wants To Say
Mal's Throes
Calm Calm Coma
The Fearsome Duo

Additional Information

The Japanese version of the album, released on Philter Records, featured two bonus tracks: Creatures (also known as The Roper Song, which appears on Claire de Leon Records' Yearbook compilation), and Minute Map.

References

2000 albums